Adolphus Dyonisius Griffin (June 11, 1868 – June 2, 1916) was an American newspaper editor and publisher in the Pacific Northwest, Los Angeles, and Kansas who focused on African-American causes, including disenfranchisement in business and politics. Also known as A. D. Griffin, he founded The New Age, Portland’s first Black newspaper, in 1896. He was friends with Booker T. Washington and participated in the Portland chapter of the National Afro-American Council. He was also an investor in real estate.

Life 
Griffin was born June 11, 1868 in Kingston, Louisiana. His parents, Fannie and Tillman Griffin, were farmers. At age 20, he moved to California.

Griffin was married to Emma K. Griffin, whom he left in 1907 when he moved to Topeka, Kansas.

He later moved to Kansas City, where he died of heart failure in his office on June 2, 1916. He was buried in Shreveport, Louisiana.

Career 

While he lived in California, Griffin helped with starting the California Eagle (Los Angeles). He moved to Portland, Oregon in 1896, where he started The New Age, an eight-page weekly newspaper he published from 1899–1907. This was the first newspaper for Portland's roughly 700 black residents. He also started land development company Enterprise Investment Company. In addition to its historical importance for articles on issues facing the black population, The New Age is unique since African-Americans were excluded by the constitution of the state of Oregon during the time the newspaper was published.

He was elected as a Republican delegate to the Oregon state convention twice.

In 1913, Griffin became a trustee and board president for Western University, a historically black college in Quindaro, Kansas. In 1916 in Kansas City, he started .

Notes

References 

1868 births
1916 deaths
African-American businesspeople
African-American publishers (people)
Journalists from Louisiana
People from DeSoto Parish, Louisiana
19th-century American businesspeople
20th-century African-American people